Enrique J. Wirth (born 25 January 1925) was an Argentine modern pentathlete. He competed at the 1948 Summer Olympics.

References

External links
 

1925 births
Possibly living people
Argentine male modern pentathletes
Olympic modern pentathletes of Argentina
Modern pentathletes at the 1948 Summer Olympics